Wechma (Arabic: وشمة) is a Moroccan film directed by Hamid Bénani, released in 1970.

Cast 

 Abdelkader Moutaa
 Mohamed Alkaghat
 Mohamed Kadan
 Khadija Moujahid
 Tawfik Dadda

References 

1970 films
Moroccan drama films